The Borders, Citizenship and Immigration Act 2009 (c. 11) is an Act of the Parliament of the United Kingdom.

Prior to the Act, residents who had spent five years living in the United Kingdom were able to apply for Indefinite Leave to Remain. Under the Act, five years of residence leads to "probationary citizenship", which can lead to full citizenship after earning a certain number of "points", such as volunteering or "civic activism."

Commencement
See section 58 of the Act and the Borders, Citizenship and Immigration Act 2009 (Commencement No. 1) Order 2009 (S.I. 2009/2731 (C. 119)).

References

External links

United Kingdom Acts of Parliament 2009
Immigration law in the United Kingdom
British nationality law
Right of asylum legislation in the United Kingdom